is a Japanese manga series written and illustrated by Masasumi Kakizaki. It was serialized in Shogakukan's shōnen manga magazine Weekly Shōnen Sunday from February 2011 to March 2015, and later in Shōnen Sunday S from December 2015 to December 2018. Its chapters were collected in seven tankōbon volumes.

Plot

Production
Masasumi Kakizaki stated that he always liked Rome from the Roman Empire era and wanted to make a work based on it. Kakizaki said that writing a realistic story of the Roman Empire would not be suited for a shōnen manga magazine, so he added dragons and other mythological creatures to the story to attract the specific audience. To make the creatures, he used an old book with illustrations of monsters and adapted them to his own art style. Kakizaki has been particularly influenced by films to make his works, and stated that Bestiarius is influenced by the 1959 film Ben-Hur.

Publication
Shogakukan published its chapters in seven tankōbon volumes, released from December 18, 2013, to February 18, 2019.

The manga has been licensed in France by Kazé, in Germany by Egmont, in Indonesia by Elex Media Komputindo, in Spain by Milky Way Ediciones and in Argentina by Editorial Ivrea.

Volume list

Reception
Writing for Le Figaro, Valentin Paquot described Bestiarius as "clever mix between Gladiator and The Lord of the Rings", adding that Kakizaki graphically reinvents mythological creatures, giving them a dark and terrifying appearance of realism. He concluded: "Bestiarius, is in the lineage of Berserk, Lodoss and other titles in the pantheon of Fantasy. A manga to discover absolutely for fans of the genre."

References

External links
 

Heroic fantasy
Historical fantasy anime and manga
Shōnen manga
Shogakukan manga